is a train station in Iwamizawa, Hokkaidō, Japan.

Lines
Kurisawa Station is served by the Muroran Main Line.

Station layout

The station has a ground-level side platform serving one track. Kitaca is not available. The station is unattended.

Adjacent stations

References

Railway stations in Hokkaido Prefecture
Railway stations in Japan opened in 1894